Heroin Man is the second album by American noise rock band Cherubs, released in 1994 through Trance Syndicate. The album's title, cover, and lyrical themes were influenced by the death of Dave DeLuna, a very close friend of the band. The band broke up before the album's release, following a fight between drummer Brent Prager and bassist Owen McMahon after a live show. Over the years, it has gained a cult following within the American underground.

The band would eventually reunite in 2014, two whole decades after the release of Heroin Man. Amphetamine Reptile Records later reissued the album on CD and LP formats in July 2017, both editions featuring silk screened artwork done by Tom Hazelmyer.

Track listing

Personnel
Cherubs
Owen McMahon – bass guitar, vocals
Brent Prager – drums
Kevin Whitley – guitar, vocals

Release history

References

External links 
 

1994 albums
Cherubs (American band) albums
Trance Syndicate albums